English author W. W. Jacobs' "The Monkey's Paw" (1902) inspired many adaptations and parodies; some are listed here.

Film, television or theatrical adaptations
 The Monkey's Paw (1915 film) a British silent film version, was directed by Sidney Northcote.
 The Monkey's Paw (1923 film), a British silent film, was directed by Manning Haynes.
The Monkey's Paw (1933) RKO Radio Pictures, was directed by Wesley Ruggles and Ernest B. Schoedsack.
 The Monkey's Paw (1948 film), a British horror film, was directed by Norman Lee.
Kagbeni (2008), directed by  Bhusan Dahal, is based on the story, but with a few changes made to adjust with the locality.
 The Monkey's Paw (2013 film), an American horror film, was directed by Brett Simmons. The film stars Stephen Lang, C.J. Thomason, Corbin Bleu, and Charles S. Dutton.

The segment "Wish You Were Here" from the 1972 film Tales from the Crypt is an adaptation.
Bob Clark's Deathdream is inspired by the short story.
Michael Scott directed and starred in a short film version.
 The Are You Afraid of the Dark? episode "The Tale of the Twisted Claw" is based on the story.
The story also inspired an episode of Brandy & Mr. Whiskers.
Short film directed by James Henschen. Filmed in 2003. Tribalfilm
A variant of this story, using a genie in a bottle, was featured in The Twilight Zone episode "The Man in the Bottle".
In an episode of The Monkees, titled "The Monkee's Paw", a nightclub magician sells the band a cursed monkey's paw in revenge after they unwittingly force him out of a job.
The Ripping Yarns story "The Curse of the Claw", first broadcast in 1977 and starring Michael Palin, is a spoof in the style of Monty Python, and is loosely inspired by "The Monkey's Paw".
The main idea was used in a season 5 episode of Buffy the Vampire Slayer entitled "Forever" in which Spike and Dawn Summers attempt to revive Joyce Summers. The episode even ends similarly to the original story, with Buffy opening the door to reveal no one there after she convinces Dawn to end their dead mother's revival.
 "Treehouse of Horror II" - In one segment of the 1991 Halloween episode of The Simpsons, the Simpson family gets a monkey's paw that grants four wishes. Each member of the family (except Marge who actually heeded the warning of the vendor) makes a wish, which have terrible consequences. In a humorous twist, Homer gladly gives the paw to his neighbor Ned Flanders, only for Ned's wishes to (apparently) go off without any of the usual consequences, causing Homer to grumble "I wish I had a monkey's paw."
 The Cartoon Network show I Am Weasel featured an episode in its fourth season entitled "The Baboon's Paw" in which Weasel's sidekick, I.R. Baboon, has the power to make his wishes come true through the use of his own paws, having been told they are lucky after attempting to buy a monkey's paw in Chinatown.
 The 21st episode of the seventh season of The X-Files, "Je Souhaite", is a remake of the monkey's paw myth in which Mulder seems to solve the puzzle.
 The K-Horror movie Wishing Stairs recasts the story with the family replaced by a trio of students at an all-girls' school and the monkey paw replaced by the eponymous stairs.
 The cartoon series Adventure Time references the concept directly in the second episode of the fifth season, "Jake the Dog," when heroes Finn and Jake meet a wish-granting being named Prismo.  Because he likes Jake, Prismo warns that all his wishes have a catch, "like a monkey's paw thing", and helps guide him into making a wish that will only have negative consequences for the villainous Lich.
 The 2017 horror film Wish Upon utilizes the concept by swapping the monkey's paw for a music box that can grant seven wishes. The music box comes into the possession of high school student Claire (Joey King), who uses the wishes for fortune, friends, love and revenge. People close to her suddenly begin dying horrifically, and she learns that others who have had the box before have died in freak accidents.
 The episode Tempting Fate, the finale to the fourth season of the BBC anthology series Inside No. 9 first broadcast on 6 February 2018, features a story based on "The Monkey's Paw".
Creepshow (TV series) season 1, episode 5, includes the segment "Night of the Paw."
 The plot of Wonder Woman 1984 revolves around the Dreamstone, a seemingly benign stone that grants one wish but at a cost. Character Steve Trevor refers to it as "the monkey's paw" in the movie.

Music
Industrial/goth band the Electric Hellfire Club released a song called "The Monkey's Paw" on their album Witness.
The story was the subject of a humorous song by the same name on Laurie Anderson's 1989 album Strange Angels.

Literature 
 The book Prom Nights from Hell: a novel consisting of five short stories written by Meg Cabot, Stephenie Meyer, Kim Harrison, Michele Jaffe and Lauren Myracle. Myracle's "The Corsage" is an adaptation of "The Monkey's Paw".

 In The Stormlight Archive series by fantasy author Brandon Sanderson, the Nightwatcher is a mysterious spren that grants wishes, but also afflicts the wisher with an individually crafted curse.

References

1902 short stories
British short stories
Horror short stories
Lists of works based on short fiction